Atung Bungsu Airport is an international airport serving Pagar Alam, South Sumatra, Indonesia.

History

Airlines and destinations

Statistics

Pagar Alam
Airports in South Sumatra